Kealoha is a masculine given name and surname of Hawaiian origin. It comes from the Hawaiian word ke, meaning "the," and aloha, meaning "love." Its cognate in the Māori language is Te Aroha, which is also used as a given name.

As a given name 

 Kealoha (ne Steven Wong), performance poet and Hawaii's first poet laureate
 Kealoha Pilares (born 1988), American football player
 Jimmy Snuka (1943–2017), Fijian American wrestler also known by his ring name, Jimmy Kealoha
 Edmund Kealoha Parker, Sr. (1931–1990), American martial artist
 Edmund Kealoha Parker Jr., American martial artist
 Shawn Kealoha Boskie
 Dane Kealoha A. A. Sardinha, American baseball player

As a surname 

J. R. Kealoha (died 1877), Native Hawaiian veteran of the American Civil War
James Kealoha (1908–1983), Hawaii politician and first Lieutenant Governor of Hawaii
Katherine Kealoha, former deputy prosecutor
Pua Kealoha (1902–1989), American competition swimmer and Olympic champion
Warren Kealoha (1903–1972), American competition swimmer and Olympic champion

Places 

 James Kealoha Beach

See also 

Hawaiian names